Kauhaneva–Pohjankangas National Park is a national park in the municipalities of Kauhajoki and Karvia in the Southern Ostrobothnia and Satakunta regions of Finland. It consists of swamp areas, mainly bogs such as the  Kauhaneva bog, scattered around it.

In 2004, the park was included in the Ramsar Convention on Wetlands of International Importance. It is also part of the Natura 2000 network of protected areas.

Geography

The Kauhaneva–Pohjankangas area is part of the south-western region of the Suomenselkä watershed area. The soil is mostly turf and the bedrock is composed of porphyric granite.

See also 
 List of national parks of Finland
 Protected areas of Finland

References

External links
 
 Outdoors.fi – Kauhaneva–Pohjankangas National Park

Protected areas established in 1982
Ramsar sites in Finland
Geography of South Ostrobothnia
Geography of Satakunta
Tourist attractions in South Ostrobothnia
Tourist attractions in Satakunta
1982 establishments in Finland
National parks of Finland